Alacaatlı can refer to the following villages in Turkey:

 Alacaatlı, Dinar
 Alacaatlı, Sındırgı